Les Démocrates (in English: The Democrats) was a provincial political party in Quebec, Canada, founded by former Ralliement créditiste du Québec leader Camil Samson and former Progressive Conservative Party of Canada federal cabinet minister Pierre Sévigny on November 18, 1978. It was renamed the Parti démocrate créditiste on January 1, 1980, a reference to the social credit theory of monetary economics. Samson joined the Liberal Party of Quebec on September 2, 1980. Sévigny remained as party leader and initially campaigned prior to the 1981 Quebec election but he did not stand as a candidate himself and the party was unable to field a slate of 10 candidates and dissolved prior to the election.

Social creditors who did not follow Samson into the Liberal Party may have joined the Parti credit social uni, which was formed in 1979 as a new provincial wing of the Social Credit Party of Canada.

See also

 Politics of Quebec
 List of Quebec general elections
 List of Quebec premiers
 List of Quebec leaders of the Opposition
 National Assembly of Quebec
 Timeline of Quebec history
 Political parties in Quebec

Notes

External links
 National Assembly historical information
 La Politique québécoise sur le Web

Social credit parties in Canada
Political parties established in 1978
Defunct provincial political parties in Quebec
Political parties disestablished in the 1980s
1978 establishments in Quebec
1980s disestablishments in Quebec